is a Japanese manufacturer of sake and plum wine based in Fushimi, Kyoto, Japan. Founded in 1637 by Jiemon Ōkura, in Fushimi, it is one of the world's oldest companies, and is a member of the Henokiens group. The name of the company literally means "laurel wreath".

Gekkeikan's United States subsidiary, Gekkeikan Sake (USA), Inc., is located in Folsom, California. The company controls approximately 25% of the American sake market.

External links
Gekkeikan official site
Gekkeikan Sake (USA), Inc. official site

References

Drink companies of Japan
Companies established in 1637
Manufacturing companies based in Kyoto
Folsom, California
Rice wine
Sake
Henokiens companies
1637 establishments in Japan